In algebra, linear equations and systems of linear equations over a field are widely studied. "Over a field" means that the coefficients of the equations and the solutions that one is looking for belong to a given field, commonly the real or the complex numbers. This article is devoted to the same problems where "field" is replaced by "commutative ring", or, typically "Noetherian integral domain".

In the case of a single equation, the problem splits in two parts. First, the ideal membership problem, which consists, given a non-homogeneous equation

 

Given a solution of the ideal membership problem, one obtains all the solutions by adding to it the elements of the module of syzygies. In other words, all the solutions are provided by the solution of these two partial problems.

In the case of several equations, the same decomposition into subproblems occurs. The first problem becomes the submodule membership problem. The second one is also called the syzygy problem.

A ring such that there are algorithms for the arithmetic operations (addition, subtraction, multiplication) and for the above problems may be called a computable ring, or effective ring. One may also say that linear algebra on the ring is effective.

The article considers the main rings for which linear algebra is effective.

Generalities
To be able to solve the syzygy problem, it is necessary that the module of syzygies is finitely generated, because it is impossible to output an infinite list. Therefore, the problems considered here make sense only for a Noetherian ring, or at least a coherent ring. In fact, this article is restricted to Noetherian integral domains because of the following result.

Given a Noetherian integral domain, if there are algorithms to solve the ideal membership problem and the syzygies problem for a single equation, then one may deduce from them algorithms for the similar problems concerning systems of equations.

This theorem is useful to prove the existence of algorithms. However, in practice, the algorithms for the systems are designed directly.

A field is an effective ring as soon one has algorithms for addition, subtraction, multiplication, and computation of multiplicative inverses. In fact, solving the submodule membership problem is what is commonly called solving the system, and solving the syzygy problem is the computation of the null space of the matrix of a system of linear equations. The basic algorithm for both problems is Gaussian elimination.

Properties of effective rings
Let  be an effective commutative ring. 
There is an algorithm for testing if an element  is a zero divisor: this amounts to solving the linear equation .
There is an algorithm for testing if an element  is a unit, and if it is, computing its inverse: this amounts to solving the linear equation .
Linear algebra is effective on the polynomial ring  if and only if one has an algorithm that computes an upper bound of the degree of the polynomials that may occur when solving linear systems of equations: if one has solving algorithms, their outputs give the degrees. Conversely, if one knows an upper bound of the degrees occurring in a solution, one may write the unknown polynomials as polynomials with unknown coefficients. Then, as two polynomials are equal if and only if their coefficients are equal, the equations of the problem become linear equations in the coefficients, that can be solved over an effective ring.

Over the integers or a principal ideal domain 

There are algorithms to solve all the problems addressed in this article over the integers. In other words, linear algebra is effective over the integers; see Linear Diophantine system for details.

More generally, linear algebra is effective on a principal ideal domain if there are algorithms for addition, subtraction and multiplication, and

It is useful to extend to the general case the notion of a unimodular matrix by calling unimodular a square matrix  whose determinant is a unit. This means that the determinant is invertible and implies that the unimodular matrices are exactly the invertible matrices such all entries of the inverse matrix belong to the domain.

such that 

Having such an algorithm, the Smith normal form of a matrix may be computed exactly as in the integer case, and this suffices to apply the described in Linear Diophantine system for getting an algorithm for solving every linear system.

The main case where this is commonly used is the case of linear systems over the ring of univariate polynomials over a field. In this case, the extended Euclidean algorithm may be used for computing the above unimodular matrix; see  for details.

Over polynomials rings over a field

Linear algebra is effective on a polynomial ring  over a field . This has been first proved in 1926 by Grete Hermann. The algorithms resulting from Hermann's results are only of historical interest, as their computational complexity is too high for allowing effective computer computation. 

Proofs that linear algebra is effective on polynomial rings and computer implementations are presently all based on Gröbner basis theory.

References 

Linear algebra
Commutative algebra
Equations